Ricky Martin Live Black and White Tour is the second live album by Ricky Martin, released by Sony BMG Norte. It was recorded during his performances at the José Miguel Agrelot Coliseum in Puerto Rico on August 10 and 11, 2007 as a part of his worldwide Black and White Tour.

Like his previous album, MTV Unplugged this album was released in a CD/DVD format, DVD and CD. It's also Martin's first ever Blu-ray Disc release.

The song "Somos la Semilla", first included on A Medio Vivir, promoted the album.

Commercial performance
Ricky Martin Live: Black and White Tour peaked inside top ten on the Spanish DVD chart and Argentine Albums chart and was certified Gold in both countries. In the United States, it reached number twelve on the Billboard Top Latin Album chart. In Mexico, the album peaked at number twenty-four and was certified Gold.

Track listing

Personnel
Ricky Martin: performer, executive producer, concept
Bruno Del Granado: executive producer
José Vega: executive producer
Jamie King: stage director
David Cabrera: music producer
Dago González: visual concept
Mónica Sosa: line producer
Josue Balsiero: cover photography
Berny Flores: back cover photography
Roman Diaz: wardrobe and costumes
Dancers: Jason Young (dance captain), Mihran Kirakosian, Christopher "War" Martinez, Tony Talauega, Tye Myers, Reshma Gajjar, Micki Duran, Vlada Gorbaneva
Musicians: Carlos David Perez, Waldo Madera, Ben Stivers, Ron Dziubla, Juan Quinones, RJ Ronquillo, Daniel Lopez, Phil McArthur, Jackie Mendez, Victor Vazquez

Charts

Weekly charts

Certifications and sales

Album

DVD

Release history

References

External links

 
 
 
 
  
   
  
 
 
 
 
 
 

Ricky Martin live albums
Ricky Martin video albums
2007 live albums
Live video albums
2007 video albums
Sony BMG Norte live albums
Sony BMG Norte video albums